Melissa Romano is an American politician and educator serving as a member of the Montana House of Representatives for the 81st district. Elected in November 2022, she assumed office on January 2, 2023.

Education 
Romano earned an associate of science degree in photography from Northwest College, a Bachelor of Science in social science from the University of Bridgeport, and a Master of Science in elementary education and teaching from the University of Bridgeport.

Career 
Since 2004, Romano has worked as an elementary math teacher in the Helena Public School District. In 2014, 2016, and 2020, she was a Democratic candidate for Montana superintendent of public instruction. She was elected to the Montana House of Representatives in November 2022.

References 

Living people
Montana Democrats
People from Helena, Montana
Politicians from Helena, Montana
University of Bridgeport alumni
Members of the Montana House of Representatives
Women state legislators in Montana
Educators from Montana
Year of birth missing (living people)